Cătălina Axente is a Romanian freestyle wrestler. She won one of the bronze medals in the 72 kg event at the 2020 European Wrestling Championships held in Rome, Italy.

Career 

In 2018, she won a bronze medal in the 76 kg event at the European U23 Wrestling Championship held in Istanbul, Turkey.

She represented Romania at the 2019 European Games held in Minsk, Belarus in the 76 kg where she lost her only match against Ayşegül Özbeğe. In 2020, she competed in the women's 76 kg event at the Individual Wrestling World Cup held in Belgrade, Serbia.

In March 2021, she competed at the European Qualification Tournament in Budapest, Hungary hoping to qualify for the 2020 Summer Olympics in Tokyo, Japan. In April 2021, she was eliminated in her first match in the 72 kg event at the European Wrestling Championships in Warsaw, Poland. In May 2021, she failed to qualify for the Olympics at the World Olympic Qualification Tournament held in Sofia, Bulgaria.

In 2022, she competed in the 76 kg event at the Yasar Dogu Tournament held in Istanbul, Turkey. She lost her bronze medal match in the 76 kg event at the 2022 European Wrestling Championships held in Budapest, Hungary.

A few months later, she also lost her bronze medal match in her event at the Matteo Pellicone Ranking Series 2022 held in Rome, Italy. She competed in the 76 kg event at the 2022 World Wrestling Championships held in Belgrade, Serbia.

Achievements

References

External links 
 

Living people
Year of birth missing (living people)
Place of birth missing (living people)
Romanian female sport wrestlers
Wrestlers at the 2019 European Games
European Games competitors for Romania
European Wrestling Championships medalists
21st-century Romanian women